Count Carlo Felice Trossi (27 April 1908 – 9 May 1949) was an Italian racecar driver and auto constructor.

Racing career
During his career, he raced for three different teams: Mercedes-Benz, Alfa Romeo and, briefly, Maserati. He won the 1947 Italian Grand Prix and the 1948 Swiss Grand Prix.

Trossi backed one of the most unusual Grand Prix cars, the Trossi-Monaco of 1935. It featured a 16-cylinder, two-stroke cycle, two-row radial, air-cooled engine and an aircraft-like body designed by Augusto Monaco. The car was a spectacular failure and never raced in a Grand Prix event.

Trossi had many exciting hobbies: racing boats and airplanes in addition to cars. He was also the president of the Scuderia Ferrari in 1932.

Enzo Ferrari said of him "He was a great racer but never wanted to make the effort to reach a dominant position and I remember him with emotion since he was one of the first to believe in my scuderia of which he was a part".

Personal life
Trossi was born in Biella, Italy. He died of a brain tumor in Milan at 41 years of age.

Racing record

Complete European Championship results
(key) (Races in bold indicate pole position; races in italics indicate fastest lap)

Notes
 – As a co-driver Trossi was ineligible for championship points

Post WWII Grandes Épreuves results
(key) (Races in bold indicate pole position; races in italics indicate fastest lap)

References

! colspan="3" style="background: #99ff66;" | Sporting achievements

Italian racing drivers
People from Biella
1908 births
1949 deaths
Counts of Italy
European Championship drivers
Grand Prix drivers
Sportspeople from the Province of Biella